Phulera is a town in Jaipur district in the Indian state of Rajasthan. It is lies nearly by Jaipur city, state capital. The DMIC (Delhi-Mumbai Industrial Corridor) project runs through Phulera. It is a major railway junction.

Geography 
It has an average elevation of 387 metres (1269 feet).

Demographics 
 India census, Phulera had a population of around 98,289. Males constitute 52% of the population and females 48%. Phulera has an average literacy rate of 86.5%,male literacy is 94.84%, and female literacy is 77.57%. In Phulera, 13% of the population is under 6 years of age.

Transport 
Phulera Junction railway station is on the Jaipur-Ahmedabad line. It has five platforms, platform no#4 & no#5 use for Jaipur - Ajmer - Ahmedabad route. It is one of the important railway junctions of NWR Zone headquartered in Jaipur. Phulera is a junction which separates two major lines of Ajmer and Jodhpur. It was one of the biggest yards a few years before. There was also a diesel locomotive depot.
 
There is no official bus-stand but you can easily get a bus service for Jaipur every 1 hour. There is also bus service for Delhi at night around 10 PM every night.

See also 
 Phulera (Rajasthan Assembly constituency)
 Phulera(h), a town and former princely state in the Northwest Frontier Province

References 
 
 

Cities and towns in Jaipur district